The Ministry of Information and Communication is a government ministry of Bhutan responsible for promoting the development of reliable and sustainable information, communications and transport networks and systems and facilitating the provision of affordable and easier access to associated services.

Objectives

 To increase safe, reliable and affordable surface and air transport;
 To enhance access to sustainable, green and inclusive public transport;
 To improve access to reliable and affordable ICT and media services;
 To improve effective and efficient public service delivery; and
 To keep alive culture and tradition through ICT and media.

Departments 
The Ministry of Information and Communication is responsible for: 
Bhutan Infocomm and Media Authority  
Department of Civil Aviation  
Department of Information and Media  
Department of Information Technology  
Road Safety and Transport Authority  
Bhutan Broadcasting Service
Bhutan Post
Bhutan Telecom  
Druk Air
Kuensel Corporation

Minister 
 Karma Donnen Wangdi (7 November 2018 - ...)

References

External links

Information and Communication
Bhutan
Bhutan
Bhutan
Transport organisations based in Bhutan
Transport in Bhutan
Communications in Bhutan